Garrin Mountain, or Kuh-e Garin, is a vast high-elevated mountain of the Zagros Mountains, located in  Hamedan Province and Lorestan Province of western Iran. 

Garrin is limited to Borujerd from the east, to Alashtar from the west, and to Nahavand from the north. It has several peaks 3,000+ meters above sea level.

See also
 List of Ultras of West Asia

References

External links
 "Kuh-e Garin, Iran" on Peakbagger
Mountains of Hamedan Province
Mountains of Lorestan Province
Landforms of Lorestan Province
Three-thousanders
Mountains of Iran